Derobrachus digueti is a species of beetle in the family Cerambycidae. It was described by Lameere in 1915.

References

Prioninae
Beetles described in 1915